Undecaprenyl-diphosphooligosaccharide-protein glycotransferase (PglB) is an enzyme with systematic name . This enzyme catalyses the following chemical reaction

  + [protein]-L-asparagine   + a glycoprotein with the oligosaccharide chain attached by N-beta-D-glycosyl linkage to protein L-asparagine

This is a bacterial enzyme that is isolated from Campylobacter jejuni and Campylobacter lari.

References

External links 
 

EC 2.4.99